Bronxville is a village in Westchester County, New York, United States, located approximately  north of Midtown Manhattan. It is part of the town of Eastchester. The village comprises one square mile (2.5 km2) of land in its entirety, approximately 20% of the town of Eastchester. As of the 2020 U.S. census, Bronxville had a population of 6,656. In 2016, Bronxville was rated by CNBC as the most expensive suburb of any of the U.S. ten largest cities, with a median home value of $2.33 million. It was ranked eighth in Bloomberg's "America's 100 Richest Places" in 2017 and 2018 and ninth in 2019 and is the second-richest town in the state of New York behind Scarsdale.

History
The region that includes the contemporary village of Bronxville was deeded to British colonists in 1666, but first settled by Europeans in the early 18th century. The two founding inhabitants were the Underhill and Morgan families. The Underhills built a sawmill and a gristmill, which was the first factory in the area, on the Bronx River. After they built a wooden bridge, the area became known as Underhill's Crossing.

Millionaire real-estate and pharmaceutical mogul William Van Duzer Lawrence sparked the development of Bronxville as an affluent suburb of New York City by building grand homes in a rustic setting. The area became "Bronxville" when the village was formally established. The population grew in the second half of the 19th century when railroads allowed commuters from Westchester County to work in New York City. Lawrence's influence can be seen throughout the community, including the historic Lawrence Park neighborhood, the Houlihan Lawrence Real Estate Corporation, and Lawrence Hospital.

The village was home to an arts colony in the early 20th century, when many noteworthy houses were built by prominent and casual architects. After the Bronx River Parkway was completed in 1925, the village expanded rapidly with the construction of several apartment buildings and townhouses, many of them built by the Lawrence family. As of 1959, the family continued to own or manage 97% of the rental market. 

The Gramatan Hotel on Sunset Hill was a residence hotel in the late 19th century and early 20th century. Gramatan was the name of the chief of the local Siwanoy Indian tribe that was centered in the Gramatan Rock area above Bronxville Station. Chief Gramatan sold the land to the settlers. The hotel was demolished in 1970, and a complex of townhouses was built on the site in 1980.

Elizabeth Clift Bacon, General George Armstrong Custer's widow, lived in Bronxville, and her house still stands to this day.

St. Joseph's Catholic Church, located in the downtown area, was attended by the Kennedys when they were residents from 1929 to about 1938 before moving to London; Edward Kennedy returned to St. Joseph's in 1958 for his wedding to Joan Bennett. Two years later, in the 1960 Presidential Election voters in the Village overwhelmingly chose Richard Nixon over Edward's brother, John, by a 5-to-1 margin.

The US Post Office–Bronxville was listed on the National Register of Historic Places in 1988. Other sites on the National Register are the Bronxville Women's Club, Lawrence Park Historic District, and Masterton-Dusenberry House.

Demographics

As of the 2020 census, there were 6,656 people and 2,212 households. The population density was 6,861.86 per square mile (17,772.1/km2).  The racial makeup of the village was 87.5% White, 1.1% African American, 0.1% Native American, 7.1% Asian, 0% Pacific Islander, 2% from two or more races. Hispanic or Latinos of any race were 7.3% of the population. As of 2000, there were 2,387 housing units, at an average density of 2,506.0 per square mile (970.1/km2).

There were 2,312 households, of which 40.8% had children under the age of 18 living with them, 64.4% were married couples living together, 6.2% had a female householder with no husband present, and 28.2% were non-families. In the village, 24.3% of all households were made up of individuals, and 11.4% had someone living alone who was 65 years of age or older. The average household size was 2.71, and the average family size was 3.27.

Age distribution was 29.1% under the age of 18, 7.3% from 18 to 24, 25.9% from 25 to 44, 25.6% from 45 to 64, and 12.2% 65 or older. The median age was 38 years. For every 100 females, there were 86.7 males. For every 100 females age 18 and over, there were 82.1 males.

The median household income was $205,781, the average household income was $340,448, and the median per capita income was $116,698—making it one of the wealthiest and most affluent places with more than 1,000 households, or a population greater than 1,000, in the United States. Median income is currently ranked 16th highest in the country. Males had a median income of $100,000, versus $61,184 for females. The per capita income for the village was $116,698 and the average family income was $417,772. About 1.7% of families and 2.7% of the population were below the poverty line, including 1.6% of those under age 18 and 2.9% of those age 65 or over. In 2016, Forbes named it one of the ten most expensive suburbs of America's major cities.

Postal code
Bronxville's 10708 ZIP code covers the village of Bronxville proper, plus Chester Heights and other sections of Eastchester, parts of Tuckahoe, and Lawrence Park West, Cedar Knolls, Armour Villa, and other sections of Yonkers. These areas are collectively known as "Bronxville P.O." This brings the ZIP code's population to 22,411 (2000 census), covering an area more than twice as large as the municipality of Bronxville itself and encompassing several institutions, including Sarah Lawrence College.

Education

Bronxville was home to Concordia College, a liberal arts college operated by the Lutheran Church–Missouri Synod. The college was shuttered on January 28, 2021 following financial difficulties accelerated by the COVID-19 pandemic. Plans are set for the campus to become acquired by nearby Iona College (New York). Adjacent to the Concordia College campus is the Chapel School—a pre-K-8 school affiliated with the Lutheran Church-Missouri Synod.

The Bronxville Public School is known as The Bronxville School. The school was started as a progressive educational institution in 1922.

St. Joseph School is a Catholic parochial school run by St. Joseph's Church. It was established in 1951, and schools children from kindergarten through eighth grade.

Parks and recreation

The Reservation, Westchester’s oldest park, was created as an adjunct to the Bronx River Parkway that opened in 1925, and was the first linear park in the United States. The Reservation features ponds, wooden footbridges and hundreds of varieties of native trees and shrubs. The park is owned by Westchester County, and it is a favorite place for bicycling, walking, running, and nature study. It is sometimes referred to by locals as the "Duck Pond".

The Bronxville School's athletic fields contain a football field, three smaller fields used for various sports like field hockey and lacrosse, and a running track (which is only 380 meters in Lane 1 because of space issues). Bacon Woodlands, located on Kensington Road, is a natural rock outcropping which has been left in its natural state, the flatter portion of which is used as an informal play area by children. Scout Field, a Westchester County Park which is located predominantly in Yonkers and Mount Vernon but is controlled by Bronxville, is heavily utilized by the Bronxville schools' soccer, football, baseball, and cross-country running programs. In 2006, Chambers Field was replaced with turf, which was funded by the community and parents of athletes in Bronxville.

Notable people

 Frank Abagnale, Jr. (born 1948), security consultant and former impostor/forger, subject of the book Catch Me if You Can and its 2002 film adaptation
 Roy Chapman Andrews (1884–1960), prominent explorer for the American Museum of Natural History
 Harriet Hubbard Ayer (1849–1903), pioneer of the women’s cosmetics industry
 Kenneth Bacon (1944–2009), Department of Defense spokesman who later served as president of Refugees International 
 Harrison Bader (born 1994), Major League Baseball outfielder for the St. Louis Cardinals and New York Yankees.
 Chris Baio (born 1984), musician
 Clarence Barnhart  (1900–1993), lexicographer, noted for the Thorndike-Barnhart school dictionary series.
 Andrew Brooks (1969–2021), associate research professor at Rutgers University and immunologist, who was the developer of the first FDA-approved rapid saliva test for COVID-19 diagnosis.
 Henry Billings Brown, US Supreme Court justice, died at the Gramatan Hotel in 1913.
 Felicia Bond, author and illustrator of children's books
 Marvin Bower, former managing director of McKinsey & Co. and "the father of modern management consulting"
 Mika Brzezinski, television journalist on Morning Joe
 Thomas S. Buechner (1936–2010), founding director of the Corning Museum of Glass and director of the Brooklyn Museum
 William J. Burns, founder of the Burns Detective Agency, and director of the FBI’s predecessor organization
 Mary Cain, middle distance runner
 Dick Clark, host of American Bandstand
 Janet Cox-Rearick, art historian
 Elizabeth Custer, widow of General George Armstrong Custer
 Jeanne Darst, writer, Fiction Ruined My Family
 Don DeLillo, writer
 Lawrence Dutton, Grammy-winning musician
 Francis William Edmonds (1806–63), genre painter
 Ford C. Frick, National League President - The third Major League Commissioner of Baseball
 Timothy Geithner, owned a home in Bronxville before his appointment as treasury secretary in 2009.
 Brendan Gill, famed New Yorker writer
 Michael Gates Gill, author of How Starbucks Saved My Life: A Son of Privilege Learns to Live Like Everyone Else
 Roger Goodell, commissioner of the National Football League
 Don Herbert (1917-2007), television host known to many as Mr. Wizard
 John Hoyt, actor
 Rose Kennedy, Kennedy family matriarch
 Joseph P. Kennedy, Kennedy family patriarch. Ambassador to Great Britain and 1st Chairman of the Securities and Exchange Commission 
 Robert F. Kennedy, 64th attorney general and U.S. senator from New York
 Ted Kennedy, U.S. senator from Massachusetts
 John F. Kennedy, 35th president of the United States of America, U.S. senator from Massachusetts
 Denison Kitchel, campaign manager for Barry M. Goldwater in 1964, was born in Bronxville in 1908.
 Lawrence Kohlberg, a psychologist famous for his theories on moral development.
 Steve Liesman, CNBC reporter
 Jamie Loeb (born 1995), tennis player
 Ginna Sulcer Marston, public service advertiser, attended Bronxville high school
 Ed McMahon, television host
 Jose Melis, musician and band leader for Jack Paar on The Tonight Show
 Jack Paar, radio and television talk show host
 Frank Patterson, Irish tenor
 Mark Patterson, investor
 Gretchen Peters, country singer/songwriter
 Peter Pennoyer, architect
 Eddie Rickenbacker, World War I fighter pilot, and later president of Eastern Airlines
 Dennis Ritchie, one of the creators of Unix and the C programming language
 Gary Robinson, software entrepreneur
 Ron Rothstein (born 1942), NBA basketball coach and  college basketball player
 Chuck Scarborough, news anchor
 William E. Schluter (1927-2018), politician who served in the New Jersey General Assembly and the New Jersey Senate.
 Tad Smith, CEO of Sotheby's
 Frederick D. Sulcer, advertising executive who wrote Put a Tiger in Your Tank for ExxonMobil
 Ruth Ann Swenson, operatic soprano
 Philip Torchio, electrical engineer known for his work with Edison Electric Company
 Charles J. Urstadt, real estate executive
 David Kenyon Webster, World War 2 soldier in Easy Company, the "Band of Brothers"
 Witold Woyda, Polish Olympic gold medalist.

In popular culture
 The Bronxville School appears in the films Firstborn (1984), starring Teri Garr and Peter Weller, and Stepmom (1998), starring Julia Roberts and Susan Sarandon.
 The Siwanoy Country Club, located in Eastchester, is featured in the films Six Degrees of Separation (1993), starring Will Smith, Stockard Channing, and Donald Sutherland and Rounders (1998), starring Matt Damon and Edward Norton.
 The film Baby Mama (2008) was shot partly on Legget Road in Bronxville.
 The opening scene in the film Tales from the Darkside (1990) was shot in Bronxville.
 A few scenes from the film Admission (2013) were filmed in Value Drugs and Womwraths in Bronxville
 In season 8, Episode 4 of the TV series Blue Bloods, DCPI Garrett Moore gets swatted at his home in Bronxville

Image gallery

See also

 Eastchester
 William Van Duzer Lawrence
 US Post Office–Bronxville
 Bronxville Women's Club
 Lawrence Park Historic District
 Masterton-Dusenberry House
 Bronxville Union Free School District
 Lawrence Hospital

References

External links

 Village of Bronxville official website
 'My Hometown' Bronxville
 Bronxville Government Access TV 

 
Villages in New York (state)
Villages in Westchester County, New York
Sundown towns in New York (state)